Alain Plante (born 4 October 1943) is a French former sports shooter. He competed in the skeet event at the 1968 Summer Olympics.

References

1943 births
Living people
French male sport shooters
Olympic shooters of France
Shooters at the 1968 Summer Olympics
Sport shooters from Paris